Oster may refer to:

Geography
Oster, a town in Chernihiv Oblast, Ukraine
Oster, Minnesota, an unincorporated community in the United States
Oster (river), a tributary of the Desna in Ukraine
Oster (Blies), a small river in the Saarland, Germany

Surname
Daniel Oster (1938–1999), French fiction and non-fiction writer
Emily Oster (born c. 1980), American economist and academic, daughter of Sharon Oster
Ernst Oster (1908—1977), German pianist, musicologist and music theorist
George Oster (1940–2018), American mathematical biologist
Grigoriy Oster (born 1947), Russian children's book author and scriptwriter
Hans Oster (1887–1945), German World War II general and figure in the German anti-Nazi resistance
Harry Oster (1923–2001), American folklorist and musicologist
Heinrich Oster (1878–1954), German chemist, business executive and Nazi war criminal
Jack Oster (c. 1910–?), British rugby footballer
Jeffrey W. Oster, US Marine Corps lieutenant general
Jennifer Oster (born 1986), German footballer
John Oster (born 1978), English-born Welsh footballer
Josef Oster (born 1971), German politician
Shai Oster, American 21st century journalist
Sharon Oster (born 1948), American economist and academic, mother of Emily
Stefan Oster (born 1965), German Catholic bishop

Other uses
, a steam ferry that sailed the fjords near Bergen, Norway from 1908 to 1963
Östers IF (ice hockey) or simply Öster, a defunct Swedish hockey team

See also
John Oster Manufacturing Company, a manufacturer of kitchen appliances, popularly known for the Oster Kitchen Center
Ostyor, Russia, a former urban-type settlement in Smolensk Oblast, Russia; since 2004—a rural locality

German toponymic surnames
Swedish toponymic surnames